Westside High School is a high school located in Anderson, South Carolina, United States. It serves the west side of Anderson and is one of two high schools in Anderson School District Five.

Westside High School is administered by Head Principal Kory Roberts, the third head principal in the school's history. This school uses the slogans "The Westside Way", "It's a Matter of Pride", and "Westside Is My Side".

Athletics

State championships 
 Basketball - Boys: 1971
 Basketball - Girls: 1989, 1991, 1992, 2021, 2022
 Football: 1969

Notable alumni
Terence Roberts (1978), first African-American mayor of Anderson, South Carolina

References

External links
 http://www.anderson5.net/westside

Public high schools in South Carolina
Schools in Anderson County, South Carolina